Mueang Uttaradit is the capital district (amphoe mueang) of Uttaradit province, northern Thailand.

Geography
Neighboring districts are (from the east clockwise) Tha Pla, Thong Saen Khan, Tron, Laplae of Uttaradit Province and Den Chai of Phrae province.

History
In 1917 the district's name was changed from "Mueang" to "Bang Pho" (บางโพ). In 1938 it was again renamed "Mueang Uttaradit".

Administration
The district is divided into 17 sub-districts (tambons), which are further subdivided into 154 villages (mubans). The town (thesaban mueang) Uttaradit covers the whole tambon Tha It. There are three more sub-district municipalities (thesaban tambon): Wang Kaphi and Ban Ko each cover the whole of their eponymous tambons, and Ban Dan Na Kham covers parts of tambon Ban Dan Na Kham. There are a further 15 tambon Administrative Organizations (TAO).

References

Mueang Uttaradit